Lure of the Wasteland is a 1939 American Western film directed by Harry L. Fraser and written by Robert Emmett Tansey. The film stars Grant Withers, LeRoy Mason, Ruth Findlay, Snub Pollard, Tom London, Henry Roquemore and Karl Hackett. The film was released on March 18, 1939, by Monogram Pictures.

Plot

Cast           
Grant Withers as Smitty
LeRoy Mason as Butch Cooper
Ruth Findlay as Ruth Carlton 
Snub Pollard as Cookie
Tom London as Carlton Foreman
Henry Roquemore as Judge Carlton
Karl Hackett as Parker
Bob Terry as Red
James Sheridan as Spike
Nolan Willis as Jim

References

External links
 

1939 films
1930s English-language films
American Western (genre) films
1939 Western (genre) films
Monogram Pictures films
Films directed by Harry L. Fraser
Films with screenplays by Harry L. Fraser
1930s American films